Bronson Kaufusi (born July 6, 1991) is an American football tight end who is a free agent. He played college football at BYU.

Early years
Kaufusi attended Timpview High School in Provo, Utah. He had 70 tackles and 9.5 sacks as junior and 19 tackles and two sacks his senior year before suffering an injury. Kaufusi was rated by Rivals.com as a four-star recruit and was committed to the Brigham Young University (BYU) to play college football.

At high school football camps, Kaufusi primarily played tight end. However, his high school team did not use tight ends.

College career
After spending two years on a mission for the Church of Jesus Christ of Latter-day Saints in Auckland, New Zealand, Kaufusi played for the first time at BYU in 2012. He played in all 13 games and had 23 tackles and 4.5 sacks. After the season, he played in 20 games for BYU's basketball team. As a sophomore in 2013, he had 41 tackles, four sacks and an interception returned for a touchdown. After spending his first two years as a defensive lineman, Kaufusi moved to linebacker his junior year. He finished the season 48 tackles and seven sacks. He moved back to defensive end his senior year and recorded 64 tackles and 11 sacks.

Professional career
On January 8, 2016, Bronson announced that he had received and accepted an invitation to the 2016 Senior Bowl. On January 30, 2016, he attended the Reese's Senior Bowl and was a part of the South's defensive line that dominated and led them to a 27–16 victory. He attended the NFL Combine and completed all of the required combine drills. Kaufusi performed well and finished 17th among defensive linemen in the 40-yard dash, fifth in the three-cone drill, tied Michigan State's Shilique Calhoun for fourth in the short shuttle, and finished 20th among defensive linemen in the bench press. On March 25, 2016, Kaufusi participated at BYU's pro day, along with Mitch Mathews, Ryker Mathews, Manoa Pikula, Graham Rowley, and six other prospects. Team representatives and scouts from 18 NFL teams attended to scout Kaufusi, who was the main attraction, as he opted to only run positional and stand on his combine numbers. At the conclusion of the pre-draft process, Kaufusi was projected as a second or third round prospect by the majority of NFL draft experts and scouts. He was ranked as the ninth best defensive end prospect by NFLDraftScout.com and the tenth best by NFL analyst Mike Mayock.

Baltimore Ravens
The Baltimore Ravens selected Kaufusi in the third round (70th overall) of the 2016 NFL Draft. He was the only BYU player drafted in 2016 and the second of three edge rushers selected by the Baltimore Ravens in the 2016 NFL Draft. The Ravens drafted Boise State's Kamalei Correa in the second round (42nd overall) and Grand Valley State's Matthew Judon in the fifth round (146th overall).

2016
On June 14, 2016, the Baltimore Ravens signed Kaufusi to a four-year, $3.45 million contract that includes a signing bonus of $845,016.

He competed with Lawrence Guy, Kapron Lewis-Moore and Mario Ojemudia throughout training camp for the backup defensive end position. On August 30, 2016, he was placed on injured/reserve after breaking his ankle in training camp. He missed the entire  season.

2017
Kaufusi competed with Brandon Williams, Carl Davis, Willie Henry throughout training camp for the vacant starting defensive end position left by the departure of Timmy Jernigan via trade. Head coach John Harbaugh named Kaufusi the backup left defensive end to Brent Urban to begin the regular season.

2018
On September 1, 2018, Kaufusi was waived by the Ravens.

New York Jets
On September 3, 2018, Kaufusi was signed to the New York Jets' practice squad. He was promoted to the active roster on October 1, 2018. He was waived on October 5, 2018 and was re-signed back to the practice squad. He was promoted back to the active roster on December 8, 2018.

On October 4, 2019, Kaufusi was released by the Jets and re-signed to the practice squad. He signed a reserve/future contract with the Jets on December 30, 2019. At the end of the 2019 season, Jets head coach Adam Gase moved him from defense to the tight end position.

On September 5, 2020, Kaufusi was released by the Jets and signed to the practice squad the next day. His practice squad contract with the team expired after the season on January 11, 2021.

Green Bay Packers
On January 15, 2021, Kaufusi signed a reserve/future contract with the Green Bay Packers.

On August 31, 2021, Packers released Kaufusi as part of their final roster cuts. Kaufusi was resigned to the practice squad the next day.

Career statistics

Personal life
His father, Steve Kaufusi, was the defensive line coach for BYU and his brother, Corbin Kaufusi, is an offensive tackle for the San Francisco 49ers. His wife, Hilary, also attended BYU and played on their soccer team. His mother, Michelle Kaufusi, is the current Mayor of Provo.

References

External links
BYU Cougars football bio
BYU Cougars basketball bio

1991 births
Living people
American football defensive tackles
American football defensive ends
American football linebackers
American men's basketball players
American Mormon missionaries in New Zealand
Baltimore Ravens players
Basketball players from Utah
BYU Cougars football players
BYU Cougars men's basketball players
Green Bay Packers players
Latter Day Saints from Utah
New York Jets players
Players of American football from Utah
Sportspeople from Provo, Utah